The Honda RA302 was a Formula One racing car produced by Honda Racing, and introduced by Honda Racing France during the 1968 Formula One season. The car was built based on an order by Soichiro Honda to develop an air-cooled Formula One engine. The magnesium-skinned car was entered in the Formula One race alongside the water-cooled, aluminium-bodied RA301 which had been developed by the existing Honda team and British Lola Cars.

It would only appear in one race, the 1968 French Grand Prix at Rouen-Les-Essarts, driven by Jo Schlesser. Schlesser was chosen to drive the RA302 because normal Honda driver John Surtees (who was the  world champion and would finish second in that race) refused to drive it as he deemed it to be unsafe and labelled it as a "potential deathtrap". This was proven on lap two of the Grand Prix; Schlesser crashed at the Virage des Six Frères section of the circuit and the car came to rest sideways against a bank. The magnesium-bodied Honda and 58 laps worth of fuel ignited instantly, killing Schlesser and destroying the original RA302.

A second RA302 was built, with slight modifications, earmarked for Surtees to drive at the 1968 Italian Grand Prix, but he again refused to drive it. Honda decided to pull out of Grand Prix racing and did not return as a constructor until the 2006 Formula One season with the Honda RA106. In 2012, the RA302 intended for Surtees at the Italian Grand Prix was on display at the Honda Collection Hall.

Formula One World Championship results
(key) (results in bold indicate pole position; results in italics indicate fastest lap)

 All 14 points scored by Honda RA301 entries.

References

External links

 The Question: Victory or Technology

Honda Formula One cars
1968 Formula One season cars